Anees Jung (born 1944) is an Indian author, journalist and columnist for newspapers in India and abroad, whose most known work, Unveiling India (1987) was a chronicle of the lives of women in India, noted especially for the depiction of Muslim women behind the purdah.

Early life and education
Born in Rourkela, and growing up in Hyderabad, Anees Jung is from an aristocratic family – her father, Nawab Hosh Yar Jung, was a scholar and poet, and served as the musahib (adviser) to the last Nizam (prince) of Hyderabad State. Her mother and brother are also Urdu poets. After schooling and college at Osmania University in Hyderabad, she went to the United States for higher studies at University of Michigan Ann Arbor, where she did her master's degree in sociology and American studies.

Career
She started her career in writing with the Youth Times, a Times of India publication, where she worked as a journalist and editor (1973 to 1980).  She has subsequently worked for The Christian Science Monitor and the International Herald Tribune. Anees Jung lives in Delhi.

Books
Jung published Unveiling India in 1987. It is a travel diary focusing on interviews with women. She has written several subsequent books on the same, talking to women about their everyday lives, including 
Night of the New Moon: Encounters with Muslim women in India (1993), 
Seven Sisters (1994).  Breaking the Silence (1997) is based on conversations on women's lives from around the world.  

Others are maltreated by alcoholic fathers or married off early or sexually abused, though some find refuge in schools set up by well-meaning NGOs.   A section of this book is part of the NCERT Class 12 English Book in CBSE Schools  Jung is noted for her lively and vivid descriptions.

Bibliography
 When a Place Becomes a Person. Vikas Pub. House, 1977. 
 Flashpoints: Poems in Prose. Tarang Paperbacks, 1981. .
 Unveiling India, Penguin Books, 1987. .
 The Song of India. Himalayan Books, 1990. 
 Night of the New Moon: Encounters with Muslim Women in India. Penguin Books, 1993. 
 Seven Sisters: Among the Women of South Asia. Penguin Books, 1994. 
 Breaking the Silence: Voices of Women from Around the World. Penguin Books, 1997. 
 Olives from Jericho: Peace in Winter Gardens. UNESCO, 1999. .
 Beyond the Courtyard: a Sequel to Unveiling India. Viking, 2003
 Lost Spring: Stories of Stolen Childhood. Penguin Books, 2005. .

See also
 List of Indian writers
 Indian literature

References

1944 births
Living people
People from Rourkela
Indian women journalists
20th-century Indian journalists
Indian women columnists
Writers from Hyderabad, India
Indian Muslims
Osmania University alumni
University of Michigan alumni
Indian travel writers
Indian columnists
20th-century Indian women writers
Journalists from Odisha
Indian women travel writers
Women writers from Telangana
Women writers from Odisha